Tania Candiani (born 1974) is a Mexican artist known for her interdisciplinary, large-scale, multimedia installations. In 2011, she was named a Guggenheim Fellow.

Candiani was born in Mexico City.

She was awarded a Guggenheim Fellowship in Fine Arts in 2011. During her fellowship term, she worked on a project exploring the interconnectedness of the construction of our homes, garments, and self-identities.

Candiani has shown her work around the world, including the Meno Parkas Galerija in Lithuania, Kunsthaus Miami in Florida, and the Museum of Contemporary Art in San Diego, and her work is held by museums such as the Centro Cultural Tijuana, the Mexican Museum in San Francisco, and the Museum of Latin American Art in Los Angeles. Her first solo museum show was Cinco variaciones sobre circunstancias fónicas y una pausa at the Laboratorio de Arte Alameda in Mexico City 2012. Her work was selected for the Mexican Pavilion at the 2015 Venice Biennale. In 2019, she participated in the "Platform" section of the Armory Show with her 2019 work Reverencia.

She was a 2010 International Studio & Curatorial Program Resident, sponsored by FONCA - Fondo National para la Cultura y las Artes. In 2018, she was a Visiting Artist and Scholar at Arizona State University.

References

1974 births
Living people
Mexican women artists
People from Mexico City
Mexican people of Italian descent